Amescua is a Spanish surname ultimately of Basque origin. Notable people with the surname include:

Antonio Mira de Amescua, (1578? – 1636?) Spanish dramatist
Gloria Amescua, Latina/Tejana writer

References

Basque-language surnames
Spanish-language surnames